The Hungarian camouflage pattern 2015M; also known as HunCam is a family of 7-color camouflage pattern. First unveiled and designed in 2015, HunCam was designed for the use of the Hungarian Defence Force in varied environments, seasons, elevations, and light conditions.

History 
The Hungarian Defence Force started experimenting with camouflage patterns after 2010. Crye Precision's MultiCam pattern was determined to be the best performing, across the widest range of environments and was subsequently selected as the basis for the new pattern.

The pattern was known to be used with Hungarian troops in peacekeeping operations throughout Kosovo in 2017.

Appearance 
The colors of the MultiCam pattern were also used in the development of the HunCam Pattern. Hungarian forces deployed in Afghanistan used this new pattern from August 2016 onwards. HunCam has a background of a brown to light tan gradient, overprinted with a dark green, olive green, and lime green gradient and a top layer of opaque dark brown and cream-colored shapes spread throughout the pattern. 

This allows for the overall appearance to change from predominantly green to predominantly brown in different areas of the fabric, while having smaller shapes to break up the larger background areas.

Users

 : Used by the Hungarian Defence Force.

See also
MultiCam#Hungary

References

Bibliography
 

Camouflage patterns
Military camouflage
Military equipment introduced in the 2010s